Psilocybin is a naturally occurring psychedelic prodrug compound produced by more than 200 species of fungi. The most potent are members of the genus Psilocybe, such as P. azurescens, P. semilanceata, and P. cyanescens, but psilocybin has also been isolated from about a dozen other genera. Psilocybin is itself biologically inactive but is quickly converted by the body to psilocin, which has mind-altering effects similar, in some aspects, to those of LSD, mescaline, and DMT. In general, the effects include euphoria, visual and mental hallucinations, changes in perception, a distorted sense of time, and perceived spiritual experiences. It can also cause adverse reactions such as nausea and panic attacks.

Imagery found on prehistoric murals and rock paintings of modern-day Spain and Algeria suggests that human usage of psilocybin mushrooms predates recorded history. In Mesoamerica, the mushrooms had long been consumed in spiritual and divinatory ceremonies before Spanish chroniclers first documented their use in the sixteenth century. In 1959, the Swiss chemist Albert Hofmann isolated the active principle psilocybin from the mushroom Psilocybe mexicana. Hofmann's employer Sandoz marketed and sold pure psilocybin to physicians and clinicians worldwide for use in psychedelic psychotherapy. Although the increasingly restrictive drug laws of the late 1960s curbed scientific research into the effects of psilocybin and other hallucinogens, its popularity as an entheogen (spirituality-enhancing agent) grew in the next decade, owing largely to the increased availability of information on how to cultivate psilocybin mushrooms.

The intensity and duration of the effects of psilocybin are variable, depending on species or cultivar of mushrooms, dosage, individual physiology, and set and setting, as was shown in experiments led by Timothy Leary at Harvard University in the early 1960s. Once ingested, psilocybin is rapidly metabolized to psilocin, which then acts on serotonin receptors in the brain. The mind-altering effects of psilocybin typically last from two to six hours, although to individuals under the influence of psilocybin, the effects may seem to last much longer, since the drug can distort the perception of time. Possession of psilocybin-containing mushrooms has been outlawed in most countries, and it has been classified as a scheduled drug by many national drug laws.

Effects

The effects of psilocybin are highly variable and depend on the mindset and environment in which the user has the experience, factors commonly referred to as set and setting. In the early 1960s, Timothy Leary and colleagues at Harvard University investigated the role of set and setting on the effects of psilocybin. They administered the drug to 175 volunteers from various backgrounds in an environment intended to be similar to a comfortable living room. Ninety-eight of the subjects were given questionnaires to assess their experiences and the contribution of background and situational factors. Individuals who had experience with psilocybin prior to the study reported more pleasant experiences than those for whom the drug was novel. Group size, dosage, preparation, and expectancy were important determinants of the drug response. In general, those in groups of more than eight felt that the groups were less supportive, and their experiences less pleasant. Conversely, smaller groups (fewer than six) were seen as more supportive, and reported more positive reactions to the drug in those groups. Leary and colleagues proposed that psilocybin heightens suggestibility, making an individual more receptive to interpersonal interactions and environmental stimuli. These findings were affirmed in a later review by Jos ten Berge (1999), who concluded that dosage, set, and setting were fundamental factors in determining the outcome of experiments that tested the effects of psychedelic drugs on artists' creativity.

After ingesting psilocybin, a wide range of subjective effects may be experienced: feelings of disorientation, lethargy, giddiness, euphoria, joy, and depression. In one study, 31% of volunteers given a high dose reported feelings of significant fear and 17% experienced transient paranoia. In studies at Johns Hopkins among those given a moderate dose (but still enough to "give a high probability of a profound and beneficial experience"), negative experiences were rare, whereas 1/3 of those given the high dose experienced anxiety or paranoia. Low doses can induce hallucinatory effects. Closed-eye hallucinations may occur, where the affected individual sees multicolored geometric shapes and vivid imaginative sequences. Some individuals report synesthesia, such as tactile sensations when viewing colors. At higher doses, psilocybin can lead to "intensification of affective responses, enhanced ability for introspection, regression to primitive and childlike thinking, and activation of vivid memory traces with pronounced emotional undertones". Open-eye visual hallucinations are common, and may be very detailed although rarely confused with reality.

A 2011 prospective study by Roland R. Griffiths and colleagues suggests that a single high dosage of psilocybin can cause long-term changes in the personality of its users. About half of the study participants—described as healthy, "spiritually active", and many possessing postgraduate degrees—showed an increase in the personality dimension of openness (assessed using the Revised NEO Personality Inventory), and this positive effect was apparent more than a year after the psilocybin session. According to the study authors, the finding is significant because "no study has prospectively demonstrated personality change in healthy adults after an experimentally manipulated discrete event". A further study by Griffiths in 2017 found that doses of 20 to 30 mg/70 kg psilocybin inducing mystical-type experiences brought more lasting changes to traits including altruism, gratitude, forgiveness and feeling close to others when they were combined with a regular meditation practice and an extensive spiritual practice support programme. Although other researchers have described instances of psychedelic drug usage leading to new psychological understandings and personal insights, it is not known whether these experimental results can be generalized to larger populations.

Physical effects
Common responses include pupil dilation (93%); changes in heart rate (100%), including increases (56%), decreases (13%), and variable responses (31%); changes in blood pressure (84%), including hypotension (34%), hypertension (28%), and general instability (22%); changes in stretch reflex (86%), including increases (80%) and decreases (6%); nausea (44%); tremor (25%); and dysmetria (16%) (inability to properly direct or limit motions). The temporary increases in blood pressure caused by the drug can be a risk factor for users with pre-existing hypertension. These qualitative somatic effects caused by psilocybin have been corroborated by several early clinical studies. A 2005 magazine survey of club goers in the UK found that nausea or vomiting was experienced by over a quarter of those who had used psilocybin mushrooms in the last year, although this effect is caused by the mushroom rather than psilocybin itself. In one study, administration of gradually increasing dosages of psilocybin daily for 21 days had no measurable effect on electrolyte levels, blood sugar levels, or liver toxicity tests.

Perceptual distortions

Psilocybin is known to strongly influence the subjective experience of the passage of time. Users often feel as if time is slowed down, resulting in the perception that "minutes appear to be hours" or "time is standing still". Studies have demonstrated that psilocybin significantly impairs subjects' ability to gauge time intervals longer than 2.5 seconds, impairs their ability to synchronize to inter-beat intervals longer than 2 seconds, and reduces their preferred tapping rate. These results are consistent with the drug's role in affecting prefrontal cortex activity, and the role that the prefrontal cortex is known to play in time perception. However, the neurochemical basis of psilocybin's effects on the perception of time are not known with certainty.

Users having a pleasant experience can feel a sense of connection to others, nature, and the universe; other perceptions and emotions are also often intensified. Users having an unpleasant experience (a "bad trip") describe a reaction accompanied by fear, other unpleasant feelings, and occasionally by dangerous behavior. In general, the phrase "bad trip" is used to describe a reaction that is characterized primarily by fear or other unpleasant emotions, not just transitory experience of such feelings. A variety of factors may contribute to a psilocybin user experiencing a bad trip, including "tripping" during an emotional or physical low or in a non-supportive environment (see: set and setting). Ingesting psilocybin in combination with other drugs, including alcohol, can also increase the likelihood of a bad trip. Other than the duration of the experience, the effects of psilocybin are similar to comparable dosages of LSD or mescaline. However, in the Psychedelics Encyclopedia, author Peter Stafford noted, "The psilocybin experience seems to be warmer, not as forceful and less isolating. It tends to build connections between people, who are generally much more in communication than when they use LSD."

Group perceptions 
Through further anthropological studies regarding "personal insights" and the psycho-social effects of psilocybin, it can be seen in many traditional societies that powerful mind-active substances such as psilocybin are regularly "consumed ritually for therapeutic purposes or for transcending normal, everyday reality". Positive effects that psilocybin has on individuals can be observed by taking on an anthropological approach and moving away from the Western bio-medical society; this is aided by the studies done by Leary. Within certain traditional societies where the use of psilocybin is frequent for shamanic healing rituals, group collectives praise their guide, healer and shaman for helping alleviate them of pains, aches and hurt. They do this through a group ritual practice where participants, or just the guide, ingests psilocybin to help extract any "toxic psychic residues or sorcerous implants" found in one's body. Group therapies using classic psychedelics are becoming more commonly used in the Western world in clinical practice. This may continue to grow as long providing the evidence remains indicative of safety and efficacy. In social sense, the group is shaped by their experiences surrounding psilocybin and how they view the plant collectively. As mentioned in anthropologist article, the group partake in a "journey" together, thus adding to the spiritual, social body, where roles, hierarchies and gender are subjectively understood.

Mystical experiences
Psilocybin mushrooms have been and continue to be used in indigenous New World cultures in religious, divinatory, or spiritual contexts. Reflecting the meaning of the word entheogen ("the god within"), the mushrooms are revered as powerful spiritual sacraments that provide access to sacred worlds. Typically used in small group community settings, they enhance group cohesion and reaffirm traditional values. Terence McKenna documented the worldwide practices of psilocybin mushroom usage as part of a cultural ethos relating to the Earth and mysteries of nature, and suggested that mushrooms enhanced self-awareness and a sense of contact with a "Transcendent Other"—reflecting a deeper understanding of our connectedness with nature.

Psychedelic drugs can induce states of consciousness that have lasting personal meaning and spiritual significance in individuals who are religious or spiritually inclined; these states are called mystical experiences. Some scholars have proposed that many of the qualities of a drug-induced mystical experience are indistinguishable from mystical experiences achieved through non-drug techniques, such as meditation or holotropic breathwork. In the 1960s, Walter Pahnke and colleagues systematically evaluated mystical experiences (which they called "mystical consciousness") by categorizing their common features. These categories, according to Pahnke, "describe the core of a universal psychological experience, free from culturally determined philosophical or theological interpretations", and allow researchers to assess mystical experiences on a qualitative, numerical scale.

In the 1962 Marsh Chapel Experiment, which was run by Pahnke at the Harvard Divinity School under the supervision of Timothy Leary, almost all of the graduate degree divinity student volunteers who received psilocybin reported profound religious experiences. One of the participants was religious scholar Huston Smith, author of several textbooks on comparative religion; he later described his experience as "the most powerful cosmic homecoming I have ever experienced." In a 25-year followup to the experiment, all of the subjects given psilocybin described their experience as having elements of "a genuine mystical nature and characterized it as one of the high points of their spiritual life". Psychedelic researcher Rick Doblin considered the study partially flawed due to incorrect implementation of the double-blind procedure, and several imprecise questions in the mystical experience questionnaire. Nevertheless, he said that the study cast "a considerable doubt on the assertion that mystical experiences catalyzed by drugs are in any way inferior to non-drug mystical experiences in both their immediate content and long-term effects". This sentiment was echoed by psychiatrist William A. Richards, who in a 2007 review stated "[psychedelic] mushroom use may constitute one technology for evoking revelatory experiences that are similar, if not identical, to those that occur through so-called spontaneous alterations of brain chemistry."

A group of researchers from Johns Hopkins School of Medicine led by Roland Griffiths conducted a study to assess the immediate and long-term psychological effects of the psilocybin experience, using a modified version of the mystical experience questionnaire and a rigorous double-blind procedure. When asked in an interview about the similarity of his work with Leary's, Griffiths explained the difference: "We are conducting rigorous, systematic research with psilocybin under carefully monitored conditions, a route which Dr. Leary abandoned in the early 1960s." The National Institute of Drug Abuse-funded study, published in 2006, has been praised by experts for the soundness of its experimental design. In the experiment, 36 volunteers without prior experience with hallucinogens were given psilocybin and methylphenidate (Ritalin) in separate sessions; the methylphenidate sessions served as a control and psychoactive placebo. The degree of mystical experience was measured using a questionnaire developed by Ralph W. Hood; 61% of subjects reported a "complete mystical experience" after their psilocybin session, while only 13% reported such an outcome after their experience with methylphenidate. Two months after taking psilocybin, 79% of the participants reported moderately to greatly increased life satisfaction and sense of well-being. About 36% of participants also had a strong to extreme "experience of fear" or dysphoria (i.e., a "bad trip") at some point during the psilocybin session (which was not reported by any subject during the methylphenidate session); about one-third of these (13% of the total) reported that this dysphoria dominated the entire session. These negative effects were reported to be easily managed by the researchers and did not have a lasting negative effect on the subject's sense of well-being.

A follow-up study conducted 14 months after the original psilocybin session confirmed that participants continued to attribute deep personal meaning to the experience. Almost one-third of the subjects reported that the experience was the single most meaningful or spiritually significant event of their lives, and over two-thirds reported it among their five most spiritually significant events. About two-thirds indicated that the experience increased their sense of well-being or life satisfaction. Even after 14 months, those who reported mystical experiences scored on average 4 percentage points higher on the personality trait of Openness/Intellect; personality traits are normally stable across the lifespan for adults. Likewise, in a recent (2010) web-based questionnaire study designed to investigate user perceptions of the benefits and harms of hallucinogenic drug use, 60% of the 503 psilocybin users reported that their use of psilocybin had a long-term positive impact on their sense of well-being.

While many recent studies have concluded that psilocybin can cause mystical-type experiences having substantial and sustained personal meaning and spiritual significance, not all the medical community agree. Paul R. McHugh, formerly director of the Department of Psychiatry and Behavioral Science at Johns Hopkins, responded as follows in a book review: "The unmentioned fact in The Harvard Psychedelic Club is that LSD, psilocybin, mescaline, and the like produce not a "higher consciousness" but rather a particular kind of "lower consciousness" known well to psychiatrists and neurologists—namely, 'toxic delirium.'"

Available forms
Although psilocybin may be prepared synthetically, outside of the research setting it is not typically used in this form. The psilocybin present in certain species of mushrooms can be ingested in several ways: by consuming fresh or dried fruit bodies, by preparing an herbal tea, or by combining with other foods to mask the bitter taste. In rare cases people have injected mushroom extracts intravenously.

Adverse effects

Most of the comparatively few fatal incidents reported in the literature that are associated with psychedelic mushroom usage involve the simultaneous use of other drugs, especially alcohol. Probably the most common cause of hospital admissions resulting from psychedelic mushroom usage involve "bad trips" or panic reactions, in which affected individuals become extremely anxious, confused, agitated, or disoriented. Accidents, self-injury, or suicide attempts can result from serious cases of acute psychotic episodes. Although no studies have linked psilocybin with birth defects, it is recommended that pregnant women avoid its usage.

Toxicity

Data is sparse, but in the decade leading up to 2020 an increasing number of psilocybin mushroom overdoses have been recorded. One analysis of mushrooms used by people hospitalized from psilocybin poisoning found high concentrations of phenethylamine (PEA), which has also been detected in the urine of people who have used psilocybin mushrooms. It is hypothesized that PEA may intensify the effect of psilocybin poisoning.

In rats, the median lethal dose (LD50) when administered orally is 280 milligrams per kilogram (mg/kg), approximately one and a half times that of caffeine. When administered intravenously in rabbits, psilocybin's LD50 is approximately 12.5 mg/kg. Based on the results of animal studies, the lethal dose of psilocybin has been extrapolated to be 6 grams, 1000 times greater than the effective dose of 6 milligrams. The Registry of Toxic Effects of Chemical Substances assigns psilocybin a relatively high therapeutic index of 641 (higher values correspond to a better safety profile); for comparison, the therapeutic indices of aspirin and nicotine are 199 and 21, respectively. The lethal dose from psilocybin toxicity alone is unknown at recreational or medicinal levels, and has rarely been documented—, only two cases attributed to overdosing on hallucinogenic mushrooms (without concurrent use of other drugs) have been reported in the scientific literature and may involve other factors aside from psilocybin.

Psychiatric
Panic reactions can occur after consumption of psilocybin-containing mushrooms, especially if the ingestion is accidental or otherwise unexpected. Reactions characterized by violent behavior, suicidal thoughts, schizophrenia-like psychosis, and convulsions have been reported in the literature. A 2005 survey conducted in the United Kingdom found that almost a quarter of those who had used psilocybin mushrooms in the past year had experienced a panic attack. Other adverse effects less frequently reported include paranoia, confusion, prolonged derealization (disconnection from reality), and mania. Psilocybin usage can temporarily induce a state of depersonalization disorder. Usage by those with schizophrenia can induce acute psychotic states requiring hospitalization.

The similarity of psilocybin-induced symptoms to those of schizophrenia has made the drug a useful research tool in behavioral and neuroimaging studies of this psychotic disorder. In both cases, psychotic symptoms are thought to arise from a "deficient gating of sensory and cognitive information" in the brain that ultimately lead to "cognitive fragmentation and psychosis". Flashbacks (spontaneous recurrences of a previous psilocybin experience) can occur long after having used psilocybin mushrooms. Hallucinogen persisting perception disorder (HPPD) is characterized by a continual presence of visual disturbances similar to those generated by psychedelic substances. Neither flashbacks nor HPPD are commonly associated with psilocybin usage, and correlations between HPPD and psychedelics are further obscured by polydrug use and other variables.

Tolerance and dependence
Tolerance to psilocybin builds and dissipates quickly; ingesting psilocybin more than about once a week can lead to diminished effects. Tolerance dissipates after a few days, so doses can be spaced several days apart to avoid the effect. A cross-tolerance can develop between psilocybin and the pharmacologically similar LSD, and between psilocybin and phenethylamines such as mescaline and DOM.

Repeated use of psilocybin does not lead to physical dependence. A 2008 study concluded that, based on US data from the period 2000–2002, adolescent-onset (defined here as ages 11–17) usage of hallucinogenic drugs (including psilocybin) did not increase the risk of drug dependence in adulthood; this was in contrast to adolescent usage of cannabis, cocaine, inhalants, anxiolytic medicines, and stimulants, all of which were associated with "an excess risk of developing clinical features associated with drug dependence". Likewise, a 2010 Dutch study ranked the relative harm of psilocybin mushrooms compared to a selection of 19 recreational drugs, including alcohol, cannabis, cocaine, ecstasy, heroin, and tobacco. Psilocybin mushrooms were ranked as the illicit drug with the lowest harm, corroborating conclusions reached earlier by expert groups in the United Kingdom.

Pharmacology

Pharmacodynamics

Psilocybin is a psychoplastogen, which refers to a compound capable of promoting rapid and sustained neuroplasticity.

Psilocybin is rapidly dephosphorylated in the body to psilocin, which is an agonist for several serotonin receptors, which are also known as 5-hydroxytryptamine (5-HT) receptors. In rats, psilocin binds with high affinity to 5-HT2A receptors and low affinity to 5-HT1 receptors, including 5-HT1A and 5-HT1D; effects are also mediated via 5-HT2C receptors. The psychotomimetic (psychosis-mimicking) effects of psilocin can be blocked in a dose-dependent fashion by the 5-HT2A antagonist drug ketanserin. Various lines of evidence have shown that interactions with non-5-HT2 receptors also contribute to the subjective and behavioral effects of the drug. For example, psilocin indirectly increases the concentration of the neurotransmitter dopamine in the basal ganglia, and some psychotomimetic symptoms of psilocin are reduced by haloperidol, a non-selective dopamine receptor antagonist. Taken together, these suggest that there may be an indirect dopaminergic contribution to psilocin's psychotomimetic effects. Psilocybin and psilocin have no affinity for dopamine receptor D2, unlike another common 5-HT receptor agonist, LSD. Psilocin antagonizes H1 receptors  with moderate affinity, compared to LSD which has a lower affinity.
Serotonin receptors are located in numerous parts of the brain, including the cerebral cortex, and are involved in a wide range of functions, including regulation of mood, motivation, body temperature, appetite and sex.

Psilocybin induces region-dependent alterations in glutamate that may be associated with subjective experiences of ego dissolution.

Pharmacokinetics

The effects of the drug begin 10–40 minutes after ingestion, and last 2–6 hours depending on dose, species, and individual metabolism. The half life of psilocybin is 163 ± 64 minutes when taken orally, or 74.1 ± 19.6 minutes when injected intravenously.

Psilocybin is metabolized mostly in the liver. As it becomes converted to psilocin, it undergoes a first-pass effect, whereby its concentration is greatly reduced before it reaches the systemic circulation. Psilocin is broken down by the enzyme monoamine oxidase to produce several metabolites that can circulate in the blood plasma, including 4-hydroxyindole-3-acetaldehyde, 4-hydroxytryptophol, and 4-hydroxyindole-3-acetic acid. Some psilocin is not broken down by enzymes and instead forms a glucuronide; this is a biochemical mechanism animals use to eliminate toxic substances by linking them with glucuronic acid, which can then be excreted in the urine. Psilocin is glucuronated by the glucuronosyltransferase enzymes UGT1A9 in the liver, and by UGT1A10 in the small intestine. Based on studies using animals, about 50% of ingested psilocybin is absorbed through the stomach and intestine. Within 24 hours, about 65% of the absorbed psilocybin is excreted into the urine, and a further 15–20% is excreted in the bile and feces. Although most of the remaining drug is eliminated in this way within 8 hours, it is still detectable in the urine after 7 days. Clinical studies show that psilocin concentrations in the plasma of adults average about 8 μg/liter within 2 hours after ingestion of a single 15 mg oral psilocybin dose; psychological effects occur with a blood plasma concentration of 4–6 μg/liter. Psilocybin is about 100 times less potent than LSD on a weight per weight basis, and the physiological effects last about half as long.

Monoamine oxidase inhibitors (MAOI) have been known to prolong and enhance the effects of DMT and one study assumed that the effect on psilocybin would be similar since it is a structural analogue of DMT. Alcohol consumption may enhance the effects of psilocybin, because acetaldehyde, one of the primary breakdown metabolites of consumed alcohol, reacts with biogenic amines present in the body to produce MAOIs related to tetrahydroisoquinoline and β-carboline. Tobacco smokers may also experience more powerful effects with psilocybin, because tobacco smoke exposure decreases the activity of MAO in the brain and peripheral organs.

Chemistry and biosynthesis
Psilocybin is classified as an alkaloid. It is more specifically classified as a tryptamine, meaning that features an indole ring linked to an aminoethyl substituent. Like other tryptamines, it is structurally and biosynthetically related to the amino acid tryptophan and the neurotransmitter serotonin. Psilocybin is a member of the general class of tryptophan-based compounds that originally functioned as antioxidants in earlier life forms before assuming more complex functions in multicellular organisms, including humans. Other related indole-containing psychedelic compounds include dimethyltryptamine, found in many plant species and in trace amounts in some mammals, and bufotenine, found in the skin of psychoactive toads.

In terms of physical properties, psilocybin is a white solid that is soluble in water, methanol and aqueous ethanol but insoluble in nonpolar organic solvents such as chloroform and petroleum ether.

Its pKa values are estimated to be 1.3 and 6.5 for the two successive phosphate OH groups and 10.4 for the dimethylamine nitrogen, so in general it exists as a zwitterionic structure.
Exposure to light is detrimental to the stability of aqueous solutions of psilocybin, and will cause it to rapidly oxidize—an important consideration when using it as an analytical standard. Osamu Shirota and colleagues reported a method for the large-scale synthesis of psilocybin without chromatographic purification in 2003. Starting with 4-hydroxyindole, they generated psilocybin from psilocin in 85% yield, a marked improvement over yields reported from previous syntheses. Purified psilocybin is a white, crystalline powder. There are two known crystalline polymorphs of psilocybin, as well as reported hydrated phases. In 2020, a second-generation synthesis of psilocybin has been developed.

Psilocybin (O-phosphoryl-4-hydroxy-N,N-dimethyltryptamine, 4-PO-Psilocin, or 4-PO-HO-DMT) is a prodrug that is converted into the pharmacologically active compound psilocin in the body by a dephosphorylation reaction. This chemical reaction takes place under strongly acidic conditions, or under physiological conditions in the body, through the action of enzymes called alkaline phosphatases.

Biosynthesis
In terms of its biosynthesis, the transformation from tryptophan to psilocybin involves several reactions: decarboxylation, methylation at the N9 position, 4-hydroxylation, and O-phosphorylation. Isotopic labeling experiments from the 1960s suggested that the biosynthesis begins with decarboxylation of tryptophan and ends with O-phosphorylation. Recent analyses using purified enzymes demonstrate that O-phosphorylation is in fact the third step, at least in P. cubensis. The sequence of the intermediate steps has been shown to involve four enzymes (PsiD, PsiH, PsiK, and PsiM) in P. cubensis and P. cyanescens, although it is possible that the biosynthetic pathway differs between species. These enzymes are encoded in gene clusters in Psilocybe, Panaeolus, and Gymnopilus.

Escherichia coli has been genetically modified to manufacture large amounts of psilocybin. Psilocybin can be produced de novo in yeast.

Analytical methods
Several relatively simple chemical tests—commercially available as reagent testing kits—can be used to assess the presence of psilocybin in extracts prepared from mushrooms. The drug reacts in the Marquis test to produce a yellow color, and a green color in the Mandelin reagent. Neither of these tests, however, is specific for psilocybin; for example, the Marquis test will react with many classes of controlled drugs, such as those containing primary amino groups and unsubstituted benzene rings, including amphetamine and methamphetamine. Ehrlich's reagent and DMACA reagent are used as chemical sprays to detect the drug after thin layer chromatography. Many modern techniques of analytical chemistry have been used to quantify psilocybin levels in mushroom samples. Although the earliest methods commonly used gas chromatography, the high temperature required to vaporize the psilocybin sample prior to analysis causes it to spontaneously lose its phosphoryl group and become psilocin—making it difficult to chemically discriminate between the two drugs. In forensic toxicology, techniques involving gas chromatography coupled to mass spectrometry (GC–MS) are the most widely used due to their high sensitivity and ability to separate compounds in complex biological mixtures. These techniques include ion mobility spectrometry, capillary zone electrophoresis, ultraviolet spectroscopy, and infrared spectroscopy. High-performance liquid chromatography (HPLC) is used with ultraviolet, fluorescence, electrochemical, and electrospray mass spectrometric detection methods.

Various chromatographic methods have been developed to detect psilocin in body fluids: the rapid emergency drug identification system (REMEDi HS), a drug screening method based on HPLC; HPLC with electrochemical detection; GC–MS; and liquid chromatography coupled to mass spectrometry. Although the determination of psilocin levels in urine can be performed without sample clean-up (i.e., removing potential contaminants that make it difficult to accurately assess concentration), the analysis in plasma or serum requires a preliminary extraction, followed by derivatization of the extracts in the case of GC–MS. A specific immunoassay has also been developed to detect psilocin in whole blood samples. A 2009 publication reported using HPLC to quickly separate forensically important illicit drugs including psilocybin and psilocin, which were identifiable within about half a minute of analysis time. These analytical techniques to determine psilocybin concentrations in body fluids are, however, not routinely available, and not typically used in clinical settings.

Natural occurrence

Psilocybin is present in varying concentrations in over 200 species of Basidiomycota mushrooms. In a 2000 review on the worldwide distribution of hallucinogenic mushrooms, Gastón Guzmán and colleagues considered these to be distributed amongst the following genera: Psilocybe (116 species), Gymnopilus (14), Panaeolus (13), Copelandia (12), Hypholoma (6), Pluteus (6), Inocybe (6), Conocybe (4), Panaeolina (4), Gerronema (2), and Galerina (1 species). Guzmán increased his estimate of the number of psilocybin-containing Psilocybe to 144 species in a 2005 review. The majority of these are found in Mexico (53 species), with the remainder distributed in the United States and Canada (22), Europe (16), Asia (15), Africa (4), and Australia and associated islands (19). The diversity of psilocybin mushrooms is reported to have been increased by horizontal transfer of the psilocybin gene cluster between unrelated mushroom species. In general, psilocybin-containing species are dark-spored, gilled mushrooms that grow in meadows and woods of the subtropics and tropics, usually in soils rich in humus and plant debris. Psilocybin mushrooms occur on all continents, but the majority of species are found in subtropical humid forests. Psilocybe species commonly found in the tropics include P. cubensis and P. subcubensis. P. semilanceata—considered by Guzmán to be the world's most widely distributed psilocybin mushroom—is found in Europe, North America, Asia, South America, Australia and New Zealand, but is entirely absent from Mexico. Although the presence or absence of psilocybin is not of much use as a chemotaxonomical marker at the familial level or higher, it is used to classify taxa of lower taxonomic groups.

Both the caps and the stems contain the psychoactive compounds, although the caps consistently contain more. The spores of these mushrooms do not contain psilocybin or psilocin. The total potency varies greatly between species and even between specimens of a species collected or grown from the same strain. Because most psilocybin biosynthesis occurs early in the formation of fruit bodies or sclerotia, younger, smaller mushrooms tend to have a higher concentration of the drug than larger, mature mushrooms. In general, the psilocybin content of mushrooms is quite variable (ranging from almost nothing to 2.5% of the dry weight) and depends on species, strain, growth and drying conditions, and mushroom size. Cultivated mushrooms have less variability in psilocybin content than wild mushrooms. The drug is more stable in dried than fresh mushrooms; dried mushrooms retain their potency for months or even years, while mushrooms stored fresh for four weeks contain only traces of the original psilocybin.

The psilocybin contents of dried herbarium specimens of Psilocybe semilanceata in one study were shown to decrease with the increasing age of the sample: collections dated 11, 33, or 118 years old contained 0.84%, 0.67%, and 0.014% (all dry weight), respectively. Mature mycelia contain some psilocybin, while young mycelia (recently germinated from spores) lack appreciable amounts. Many species of mushrooms containing psilocybin also contain lesser amounts of the analog compounds baeocystin and norbaeocystin, chemicals thought to be biogenic precursors. Although most species of psilocybin-containing mushrooms bruise blue when handled or damaged due to the oxidization of phenolic compounds, this reaction is not a definitive method of identification or determining a mushroom's potency.

History

Early

There is evidence to suggest that psychoactive mushrooms have been used by humans in religious ceremonies for thousands of years. 6,000-year-old pictographs discovered near the Spanish town of Villar del Humo illustrate several mushrooms that have been tentatively identified as Psilocybe hispanica, a hallucinogenic species native to the area.

Archaeological artifacts from Mexico, as well as the so-called Mayan "mushroom stones" of Guatemala have also been interpreted by some scholars as evidence for ritual and ceremonial usage of psychoactive mushrooms in the Mayan and Aztec cultures of Mesoamerica. In Nahuatl, the language of the Aztecs, the mushrooms were called teonanácatl, or "God's flesh". Following the arrival of Spanish explorers to the New World in the sixteenth century, chroniclers reported the use of mushrooms by the natives for ceremonial and religious purposes. According to the Dominican friar Diego Durán in The History of the Indies of New Spain (published c. 1581), mushrooms were eaten in festivities conducted on the occasion of the accession to the throne of Aztec emperor Moctezuma II in 1502. The Franciscan friar Bernardino de Sahagún wrote of witnessing mushroom usage in his Florentine Codex (published 1545–1590), and described how some merchants would celebrate upon returning from a successful business trip by consuming mushrooms to evoke revelatory visions. After the defeat of the Aztecs, the Spanish forbade traditional religious practices and rituals that they considered "pagan idolatry", including ceremonial mushroom use. For the next four centuries, the Indians of Mesoamerica hid their use of entheogens from the Spanish authorities.

Although dozens of species of psychedelic mushrooms are found in Europe, there is little documented usage of these species in Old World history besides the use of Amanita muscaria among Siberian peoples. The few existing historical accounts about psilocybin mushrooms typically lack sufficient information to allow species identification, and usually refer to the nature of their effects. For example, Flemish botanist Carolus Clusius (1526–1609) described the bolond gomba (crazy mushroom), used in rural Hungary to prepare love potions. English botanist John Parkinson included details about a "foolish mushroom" in his 1640 herbal Theatricum Botanicum. The first reliably documented report of intoxication with Psilocybe semilanceata—Europe's most common and widespread psychedelic mushroom—involved a British family in 1799, who prepared a meal with mushrooms they had picked in London's Green Park.

Modern
American banker and amateur ethnomycologist R. Gordon Wasson and his wife Valentina P. Wasson, a physician, studied the ritual use of psychoactive mushrooms by the native population in the Mazatec village Huautla de Jiménez, Mexico. In 1957, Wasson described the psychedelic visions that he experienced during these rituals in "Seeking the Magic Mushroom", an article published in the popular American weekly Life magazine. Later the same year they were accompanied on a follow-up expedition by French mycologist Roger Heim, who identified several of the mushrooms as Psilocybe species. Heim cultivated the mushrooms in France, and sent samples for analysis to Albert Hofmann, a chemist employed by the Swiss multinational pharmaceutical company Sandoz (now Novartis). Hofmann, who had in 1938 created LSD, led a research group that isolated and identified the psychoactive compounds from Psilocybe mexicana. Hofmann was aided in the discovery process by his willingness to ingest mushroom extracts to help verify the presence of the active compounds. He and his colleagues later synthesized a number of compounds chemically related to the naturally occurring psilocybin, to see how structural changes would affect psychoactivity. The new molecules differed from psilocybin in the position of the phosphoryl or hydroxyl group at the top of the indole ring, and in the numbers of methyl groups (CH3) and other additional carbon chains.

Two diethyl analogs (containing two ethyl groups in place of the two methyl groups) of psilocybin and psilocin were synthesized by Hofmann: 4-phosphoryloxy-N,N-diethyltryptamine, called CEY-19, and 4-hydroxy-N,N-diethyltryptamine, called CZ-74. Because their physiological effects last only about three and a half hours (about half as long as psilocybin), they proved more manageable in European clinics using "psycholytic therapy"—a form of psychotherapy involving the controlled use of psychedelic drugs. Sandoz marketed and sold pure psilocybin under the name Indocybin to physicians and clinicians worldwide. There were no reports of serious complications when psilocybin was used in this way.

In the early 1960s, Harvard University became a testing ground for psilocybin, through the efforts of Timothy Leary and his associates Ralph Metzner and Richard Alpert (who later changed his name to Ram Dass). Leary obtained synthesized psilocybin from Hofmann through Sandoz pharmaceutical. Some studies, such as the Concord Prison Experiment, suggested promising results using psilocybin in clinical psychiatry. According to a 2008 review of safety guidelines in human hallucinogenic research, however, Leary and Alpert's well-publicized termination from Harvard and later advocacy of hallucinogen use "further undermined an objective scientific approach to studying these compounds". In response to concerns about the increase in unauthorized use of psychedelic drugs by the general public, psilocybin and other hallucinogenic drugs suffered negative press and faced increasingly restrictive laws. In the United States, laws were passed in 1966 that prohibited the production, trade, or ingestion of hallucinogenic drugs; Sandoz stopped producing LSD and psilocybin the same year. Further backlash against LSD usage swept psilocybin along with it into the Schedule I category of illicit drugs in 1970. Subsequent restrictions on the use of these drugs in human research made funding for such projects difficult to obtain, and scientists who worked with psychedelic drugs faced being "professionally marginalized".

Despite the legal restrictions on psilocybin use, the 1970s witnessed the emergence of psilocybin as the "entheogen of choice". This was due in large part to a wide dissemination of information on the topic, which included works such as those by author Carlos Castaneda, and several books that taught the technique of growing psilocybin mushrooms. One of the most popular of this latter group was published in 1976 under the pseudonyms O.T. Oss and O.N. Oeric by Jeremy Bigwood, Dennis J. McKenna, K. Harrison McKenna, and Terence McKenna, entitled Psilocybin: Magic Mushroom Grower's Guide. Over 100,000 copies were sold by 1981. As ethnobiologist Jonathan Ott explains, "These authors adapted San Antonio's technique (for producing edible mushrooms by casing mycelial cultures on a rye grain substrate; San Antonio 1971) to the production of Psilocybe [Stropharia] cubensis. The new technique involved the use of ordinary kitchen implements, and for the first time the layperson was able to produce a potent entheogen in his own home, without access to sophisticated technology, equipment or chemical supplies." San Antonio's technique describes a method to grow the common edible mushroom Agaricus bisporus

Because of a lack of clarity about laws about psilocybin mushrooms, retailers in the late 1990s and early 2000s commercialized and marketed them in smartshops in the Netherlands and the UK, and online. Several websites emerged that have contributed to the accessibility of information on description, use, effects and exchange of experiences among users. Since 2001, six EU countries have tightened their legislation on psilocybin mushrooms in response to concerns about their prevalence and increasing usage. In the 1990s, hallucinogens and their effects on human consciousness were again the subject of scientific study, particularly in Europe. Advances in neuropharmacology and neuropsychology, and the availability of brain imaging techniques have provided impetus for using drugs like psilocybin to probe the "neural underpinnings of psychotic symptom formation including ego disorders and hallucinations". Recent studies in the United States have attracted attention from the popular press and thrust psilocybin back into the limelight.

Society and culture

Legal status

Advocacy for tolerance
Despite being illegal in many typically Western countries, such as the UK, Australia and some US states, less conservative governments opt to nurture the legal use of psilocybin and other psychedelic drugs. In Amsterdam, Netherlands, authorities provide education and promotion on the safe use of psychedelic drugs, such as psilocybin, in an aim to reduce public harm.  Similarly, religious groups like America's Uniao do Vegetal, UDV, use psychedelics in traditional ceremonies.

Advocate for legalization argue there is a lack of evidence of harm, and potential use in treating certain mental health conditions. Research is difficult to conduct because of the legal status of psychoactive substances. Advocates for legalization also promote the utility of "ego dissolution" and argue bans are cultural discrimination against traditional users.

Usage

A 2009 national survey of drug use by the US Department of Health and Human Services concluded that the number of first-time psilocybin mushroom users in the United States was roughly equivalent to the number of first-time users of cannabis. In European countries, the lifetime prevalence estimates of psychedelic mushroom usage among young adults (15–34 years) range from 0.3% to 14.1%.

In modern Mexico, traditional ceremonial use survives among several indigenous groups, including the Nahuas, the Matlatzinca, the Totonacs, the Mazatecs, Mixes, Zapotecs, and the Chatino. Guzmán suggests this is a vestige of Spanish colonial influence from several hundred years earlier, when mushroom use was persecuted by the Catholic Church.

Research

Psilocybin has been a subject of preliminary research since the early 1960s, when the Harvard Psilocybin Project evaluated the potential therapeutic value of psilocybin for personality disorders. Beginning in the 2000s decade, research on anxiety disorders, major depression, and various addictions was conducted. Psilocybin has been tested for its potential for developing prescription drugs to treat drug dependence, anxiety, or mood disorders. Psilocybin and LSD are under preliminary research as possible psychoplastogens.

In 2018–2019, the United States Food and Drug Administration (FDA) granted Breakthrough Therapy Designation for psilocybin-assisted therapy for treatment-resistant depression and major depressive disorder, a review process enabling the FDA to implement an expedited review if clinical research results for psilocybin use in treating depression are compelling. A 2021 review found use of psilocybin was associated with reduced intensity of depression symptoms.

See also

 List of entheogens
 O-Acetylpsilocin
 Psychoactive drug
 Psychedelic experience
 Psychedelic microdosing
 Psychedelic plants
 Soma (drink)
 Psychoplastogen

Explanatory notes

References

Citations 

== External links ==
Psilocybin Investigator's Brochure  Usona Institute, 2021

Psychedelic drugs
Psychedelic tryptamines
Entheogens
Mycotoxins
Tryptamine alkaloids
Serotonin receptor agonists
Organophosphates
Phenol esters
Novartis brands